Dear Zindagi is a 2016 Indian Hindi-language coming-of-age drama film written and directed by Gauri Shinde. It was produced by Gauri Khan, Karan Johar, and Shinde under the banners of Red Chillies Entertainment, Dharma Productions, and Hope Productions respectively. The film stars Alia Bhatt and Shah Rukh Khan in the lead role with Ira Dubey, Kunal Kapoor, Angad Bedi, Ali Zafar, Yashaswini Dayama and Rohit Suresh Saraf in supporting roles. The plot centres on a budding cinematographer who is discontented with her life and meets a free-spirited psychologist who helps her to gain a new perspective on her life.

Development of the film began in 2015, when Shinde signed Bhatt and Khan for a film to be made under her banner. Principal photography took place in Goa and Mumbai, in the period from 21 January to 20 May 2016. The film features a score composed by Amit Trivedi and lyrics written mostly by Kausar Munir.

Dear Zindagi released on 23 November 2016 in North America, two days before its worldwide release on 25 November 2016, and grossed  at the box office, thus emerging as a commercial success. It received positive reviews from critics, with particular praise directed towards the themes, direction, screenplay, dialogues, soundtrack and cast performances, with particular praise directed towards Bhatt and Khan's performances. 

At the 62nd Filmfare Awards, Dear Zindagi received 2 nominations – Best Actress (Bhatt) and Best Lyricist ( for "Love You Zindagi").

Plot 
Kaira is an aspiring cinematographer working in Mumbai at a small firm which is just as wannabe (and going nowhere) as she is. She dreams of directing her own films. Blunt and cynical, she is most comfortable when with her three best friends, Fatima, Jackie and Ganju, all of whom dream big and make up for the banality of their day jobs by making sure that their evenings and nights are glamourous and modern, fast and loose. Kaira's life takes a downturn when she casually sleeps with Raghuvendra, a film producer, and then breaks up with her childhood sweetheart Sid, a rest-o-bar owner. Raghuvendra then gets engaged to his ex. Kiara's landlord evicts her because the building residents' association is sick of her bohemian lifestyle and asks him to rent apartments to decent married couples and families only. All of this compels Kaira to grudgingly go back to Goa to live with her parents, with whom she has some old issues. She ends up spending many sleepless nights in unhappiness and uncertainty.

While in Goa, Kaira seeks out Dr. Jehangir "Jug" Khan, a psychologist, for her insomnia after inadvertently having heard him speak at a Mental Health Awareness Conference. She warms to Jug's unconventional methods, trying to use them to understand herself. Meanwhile, she meets a musician, Rumi, and falls in love with him, but they break up before anything serious can happen after she realises they may not be the right fit for each other. During this time, Kaira reunites with her younger brother, Kiddo, who is the only person in her family that she relates to. Matters with her family come to a head when Kaira has an outburst at a family get-together, where she confronts her parents about them abandoning her for years at her grandparents' house.

Kaira finally narrates the story of her abandonment to Jug, who tells her that she fears abandonment so much that she does not allow herself to commit in relationships, leaving them before they can leave her. He convinces her that she does not need to forgive her parents for abandoning her in her childhood, but rather, she should have the maturity as an adult to see them as two regular people who are capable of making mistakes like everyone else. After this, Kaira makes an effort to reconcile with her parents and also works to finish her short film.

At their last session, Kaira admits to Jug that she has grown to love him. Jug responds that it is normal for a patient to feel this way about their therapist, and while he likes her platonically, a relationship would not be possible between them. The two share a hug before Kaira leaves.

Kaira finally completes her short film, which she had been working on for years. At the premiere, her friends, family, and exes are present to cheer her on. This is where Kaira meets a furniture designer and strikes a conversation with him.

Cast 

 Alia Bhatt as Kaira, who is also referred to as "Seerat."
 Shah Rukh Khan as Dr. Jehangir "Jug" Khan, a psychologist.
 Kunal Kapoor as Raghuvendra, a film producer, one of Kaira's boyfriends
 Angad Bedi as Sid, a restobar owner, another of Kaira's boyfriends
 Ali Zafar as Rumi, a musician and singer-songwriter, yet another of Kaira's boyfriends.
 Ira Dubey as Fatima, Kaira's friend, who is also referred to as "Fatty"
 Rohit Suresh Saraf as Kiddo, Kaira's younger brother
 Yashaswini Dayama as Jackie, Kaira's friend
 Gautmik as Ganju, Kaira's friend
 Yashwant Singh as Kaira's uncle
 Salone Mehta as Kaira's aunt
 Baby Dishita as little Kaira
 Nitika Anand as family friend
 Amit Nagraj as little Kiddo
 Aban Deohans as Kaira's mother
 Atul Kale as Kaira's father
 Martha Xavier Fernandes as Kaira's maternal grandmother
 Madhav Vaze as Kaira's maternal grandfather
 Ivan Sylvester Rodrigues as vice president of a hotel, friend of Kaira's father 
 Akanksha Gade as maid Alka
 Aditya Roy Kapur as Daljeet Sharma, a furniture dealer (guest appearance)

Source:

Production 
Made on a moderate budget, Dear Zindagi was produced by Gauri Khan of Red Chillies Entertainment, Johar of Dharma Productions and Gauri Shinde of Hope Productions. The film was directed by Shinde, her second directorial after the comedy-drama film English Vinglish (2012). When Shinde was asked in an interview with The Indian Express, whether there is a personal story to Dear Zindagi, she replied, "Dear Zindagi is inspired by life in general. It started with an idea about the connections we make in our lives and how such connections can impact us. That's something that interested me and I tried to develop a story around the philosophy." In August 2015, Shinde revealed that she had "almost" completed working on the screenplay. Pre-production work began in December 2015. Shinde began working in the story at that time, and she chose Goa and Mumbai as the film's key locations. The production crew consisted primarily of people Shinde had worked with in English Vinglish, with the exception of production designer Rupin Suchakthey are film editor Hemanti Sarkar, script assistant Krishnan Hariharan who was elevated to co-writer, language consultant Kausar Munir, who also doubled up as lyricist while playing co-writer, and cinematographer Laxman Utekar.

India Today reported that Bhatt and Khan would star together in Shinde's then-untitled film. Bhatt was very eager to work with Khan. It is Khan's first film with Bhatt. It was reported that there would not be any typical romance between the characters of Bhatt and Khan. Shinde confirmed to The Indian Express saying, "It won't be as typical as one expects man and woman to be together." In April 2016, it was reported that Khan would play a love guru who would help Bhatt's character to manage the attention of four people and figure out how to find her true love, and Bhatt would play the role of a filmmaker, whose experiences with all four characters would shape her life and work.

The other actors who were signed up for the film include Ali Zafar, who played the role of rockstar and musician; Angad Bedi, who played the role of Kaira's childhood sweetheart, a restobar owner; Kunal Kapoor, who played the role of Kaira's film producer and invested in Bhatt's film; and Aditya Roy Kapur, who played the role of a charming furniture dealer. Ira Dubey and Yashaswini Dayama played the role of Kaira's best-friends, while Rohit Saraf played the role of her brother.

Principal photography for Dear Zindagi began on 21 January 2016 in Goa. The shoot for the entire film was to be completed in two schedules; one in Goa and the other in Mumbai. The first schedule of Goa was completed in the last week of February 2016 after about 30 days, then the entire cast of the film moved to Mumbai for the second schedule of the film. Bhatt and Shah Rukh Khan enjoyed working together and were looking forward to the next schedule. Bhatt had also moved to Singapore to shoot for a song sequence for the film. The entire shooting of the film ended on 20 May 2016. Bhatt shared the entire shooting experience by posting a group selfie with her team in Singapore, via her Instagram handle. In March 2016, Bhatt said to India.com that she was very excited about appearing with Khan in the film. She had not slept for several nights during the shoot of the film. "It was lovely working with him on the show and on Gauri's film when we recently shot in Goa," she said. On 23 June 2016, The Times of India reported that the title of the film would be Dear Zindagi.

Music 

The soundtrack was released by Sony Music India. The full album was released on 15 November 2016. Audio Jukebox was released on 21 November 2016 on YouTube.

The song "Ae Zindagi Gale Laga Le"; written by Gulzar and was originally composed by Ilaiyaraaja and sung by Suresh Wadkar for Sadma (1983); has been recreated for the film. While, lyrics for the other songs in the album are written by Kausar Munir.

Critical response
Suanshu Khurana and A. Kameshwari of The Indian Express praised the music and respectively said, "A fresh and enthusiastic set, with life's tales told in a breezy fashion. The album lacks variance, yet, it manages to have many sparkling moments." and, "Sensible and relatable songs making the album simplistic that automatically gets registered at the back of your mind, a poetic version of our exact feelings."

Joginder Tuteja of Bollywood Hungama, rating the music album a 3.5 out of 5 stars, said that it was "a series of situational songs that should sound good in the film's narrative." Rinky Kumar of The Times of India rated 3 stars to the album, saying, "this movie doesn't have songs that have a high recall value."

Release 
The film was released in Canada and the USA on 23 November 2016, and worldwide on 25 November 2016. It opened in about 1200 theatres nationwide and in 600 theatres in other countries. The film also had a special screening on 23 November 2016 in Mumbai. It received good response and positive reviews

Dear Zindagi opened well in multiplexes in Mumbai, Mysore, Tamil Nadu and Kerala, while in North India it had a comparatively decent opening. The film released earlier in North America on account of the Thanksgiving weekend holidays. The film on its first day collected 1.19 crore from 127 screens in the United States and 8.29 lakhs in Canada from 16 screens. In the extended two-day weekend, the film collected about 15.8 million at the North America box office. The film earned a total of 94.67 crore in India, grossing 136 million worldwide.

Critical response 
Dear Zindagi received positive reviews from critics, with particular praise directed towards Bhatt and Khan's performances, direction, music, screenplay and themes. On review aggregator Rotten Tomatoes, the film holds an approval rating of 69%, based on 13 reviews with an average rating of 6.56/10. Meena Iyer of The Times of India gave the film a 3.5 (out of 5) rating, described Bhatt's character as "feisty", praised Bhatt and Khan's performances. Namrata Joshi of The Hindu rated the film 3 out of 5 stars, noting that "the chemistry between Bhatt and Khan makes the film sparkle despite the heavy-handed writing." Ananya Bhattacharya of India Today, giving the same rating, said that Dear Zindagi is "an emotional joyride which won't harm you when watched once." She recommended to watch the film due to the performances by its two principal actors. Mayank Shekhar of Mid-Day also rated it 3 (out of 5) stars, saying: "This film, at its core, is conversational sort of feature, but mostly quiet, even indoorsy."

Conversely, Rohit Bhatnagar writing for Deccan Chronicle gave the film 2.5 out of 5 stars, and thought that the film was "definitely a one-time-watch", and concluded, that the film deserves a watch but "only for amazing performances and nothing else." A reviewer for Bollywood Hungama giving the same rating to the film commented that Dear Zindagi was "a slow-paced cerebral and contemporary slice of life tale about the challenges today's generation of girls face in a rapidly shifting landscape." Sweta Kaushal of Hindustan Times rated the film 2 out of 5 stars, and wrote, "There is a lot of banter in the film that is supposed to be deep and philosophical but is really just plain, hollow banter", and concluded, that the film "could-have-been-amazing." Shubhra Gupta of The Indian Express gave it a negative review and summed up her review by writing that the "film could have been a solid drama with emotional heft but despite great performances by the two stars, the feature remains strictly boiler-plate."

Christine Iyer of The National awarded the film 4 out of 5 stars, praised Khan's performance and said that he "absolutely shines in the role of soft-spoken therapist Jehangir 'Jug' Khan in this gentle drama by Gauri Shinde." Manjusha Radhakrishnan of Gulf News rated the film 3.5 out of 5 stars and described the tale of Bhatt as "joyously entertaining", and advised to "make a date with Dear Zindagi." Anisha Jhaveri of IndieWire gave the film a grade of A-minus, and said that the film's plot had a "powerful message, that gives Dear Zindagi its substance." Shilpa Jamkhandikar of Reuters negatively stated: "The need to explain every moment and articulate every emotion pulls down Dear Zindagi; even the brilliant chemistry between the two leads cannot salvage the film from this fatal flaw." Andy Webster of The New York Times described it an "insightful movie", and a "resounding victory."

Accolades

Controversy 
In the first week of November 2016, it was reported that Ali Zafar has been replaced by Tahir Raj Bhasin in the film due to the tensions created after the 2016 Uri terror attack and the subsequent ban on Pakistani actors by the Maharashtra Navnirman Sena. However, on 15 November 2016, Pakistan's newspaper Dawn reported that Bhatt denied the rumours at an event on 14 November 2016. On being asked, she said: "Nobody is being replaced. The film will release in its full form." Ali Zafar has sung two songs for the film, but those were dubbed by Arijit Singh, whose versions were added into the soundtrack album instead of Zafar's. Later, Zafar's songs were officially shared online.

Shortly after the release of the film, Temple Street Productions sent a legal notice to Karan Johar's Dharma Productions for copyright infringement, alleging that the movie was inspired in detail by the Canadian television series Being Erica. Shinde has denied the claim.

See also 
List of Bollywood films of 2016

References

External links 
 Official website
 
 

2010s Hindi-language films
2016 films
2010s coming-of-age drama films
Films about depression
Indian coming-of-age drama films
Films shot in India
Films set in Goa
Films set in Mumbai
Reliance Entertainment films
Films scored by Amit Trivedi
Sexuality and age in fiction
Red Chillies Entertainment films
2016 drama films
Films directed by Gauri Shinde